Stephen C. Davenport (June 27, 1924 – August 17, 2011) was an American lawyer, accountant, and politician who was a member of the Massachusetts Senate from 1965 to 1969 and the Massachusetts House of Representatives from 1961 to 1965. He was a candidate for Mayor of Boston in 1967. Prior to serving in the Massachusetts General Court, Davenport served as Assistant Corporation Counsel for the City of Boston from 1950 to 1961.

He was born in Roslindale, Massachusetts, and represented Jamaica Plain for most of his career. He served as a Navy jet fighter in World War II and the Korean War. He was married to Margaret "Margie" (Kane) Davenport and had one daughter and two sons. He died in August 2011.

References

Democratic Party Massachusetts state senators
Democratic Party members of the Massachusetts House of Representatives
Politicians from Boston
Boston University School of Management alumni
Boston University School of Law alumni
Bentley University alumni
1924 births
2011 deaths
Lawyers from Boston
People from Roslindale
20th-century American lawyers